The genus Alcurus is a small genus of songbirds in the bulbul family, Pycnonotidae.

It has two species:
 Striated bulbul (Alcurus striatus, formerly Pycnonotus striatus)
 Spot-necked bulbul (Alcurus  tympanistrigus, formerly Pycnonotus tympanistrigus)

References

Alcurus
Bird genera
Taxa named by Edward Blyth